The 1890 Washington & Jefferson football team was an American football team that represented Washington & Jefferson College during the 1890 college football season. The team compiled a 2–1 record, though Washington claims a 3–0 record.

In the team's final game against , Washington & Jefferson led, 4–0, in the second half. As Wooster drove close to the Washington & Jefferson goal line, several of the Washington & Jefferson players "left the game and started at race horse speed for the dressing room, despite the cries on every side that time was not up and they still had 10 minutes to play." Wooster's captain grabbed the ball, ran the remaining three yards, and claimed a touchdown. Wooster then converted the kick for goal to take a 6 to 4 lead. The Washington & Jefferson team then left the field with their ball, protesting the Wooster touchdown. The umpire, a Washington & Jefferson supporter, upheld the protest and awarded the game to his side. The referee, a Wooster supporter, rejected the protest and awarded the game to his side. Another account awarded the game to Wooster by default as a result of Washington & Jefferson leaving the grounds.

Schedule

References

Washington and Jefferson
Washington & Jefferson Presidents football seasons
Washington and Jefferson football